The 2020–21 season will be Újpest FC's 140th competitive season, 129th consecutive season in the OTP Bank Liga and 128th year in existence as a football club.

Transfers

Summer

In:

Out:

Source:

Competitions

Overview

Nemzeti Bajnokság I

League table

Results summary

Results by round

Matches

Hungarian Cup

Appearances and goals
Last updated on 20 December 2020.

|-
|colspan="14"|Youth players:

|-
|colspan="14"|Players no longer at the club:
|}

Top scorers
Includes all competitive matches. The list is sorted by shirt number when total goals are equal.
Last updated on 20 December 2020

Disciplinary record
Includes all competitive matches. Players with 1 card or more included only.

Last updated on 20 December 2020

Clean sheets
Last updated on 20 December 2020

References

External links
 Official Website
 UEFA
 Fixtures and results

Újpest FC seasons
Hungarian football clubs 2020–21 season